Andy Schillinger (born November 22, 1964) is a former American football wide receiver. He played for the Phoenix Cardinals in 1988.

References

1964 births
Living people
American football wide receivers
Miami RedHawks football players
Phoenix Cardinals players